Tegostoma zachlora is a moth in the family Crambidae. It was described by Edward Meyrick in 1891. It is found in Algeria.

References

Odontiini
Moths described in 1891
Moths of Africa
Taxa named by Edward Meyrick